Prisoner of Rio is a 1988 drama film directed by Lech Majewski and starring Steven Berkoff, Paul Freeman and Peter Firth. It shows the flight of the Great Train Robber Ronnie Biggs to Brazil and the attempts of Scotland Yard detectives to re-capture him. It was a co-production between several countries.

Plot
After escaping from Wandsworth prison for his part in the Great Train Robbery, Ronald "Ronnie" Biggs (Paul Freeman) goes on the run to Rio de Janeiro and becomes the world's most wanted man. Hot on his trail however is committed copper Jack McFarland (Steven Berkoff), who will stop at nothing to bring him back to justice - even if that means stepping outside the law.

Cast
 Steven Berkoff ...  Jack McFarland
 Paul Freeman ...  Ronald Biggs
 Peter Firth ...  Clive Ingram
 Florinda Bolkan ...  Stella
 Desmond Llewelyn ...  Commissioner Ingram
 José Wilker ...  Salo
 Zezé Motta ...  Rita
 Breno Moroni ...  Gil
 Ronald Biggs ...  Mickey
 Dennis Bourke ...  Reporter at Phonebooth
 Wilza Carla ...  Woman in red
 Claudia Cepeda ...  Girl in Car
 Amauri Guarilha ...  Policeman in Slum
 Chris Hieatt ...  John
 Elke Maravilha ...  Frank
 Roy Pepperell ... British Consular

Release
The film was released in the United Kingdom by Palace Pictures and later on VHS by Palace Video.  It was later released on DVD in the UK by Anchor Bay Entertainment.

It was released on VHS in the United States by Imperial Entertainment.

Production
The real-life Ronald Biggs, the focus of the film, co-wrote the screenplay.

Steven Berkoff wrote a book about his experiences on this film, called "A Prisoner in Rio".  He hated making this film and on many occasions he had to stop himself from walking away from production.

References

External links

1988 films
Swiss drama films
English-language Swiss films
Polish drama films
English-language Polish films
Brazilian drama films
English-language Brazilian films
1988 drama films
Films directed by Lech Majewski
Films set in Rio de Janeiro (city)
Films scored by Hans Zimmer
British drama films
1980s English-language films
1980s British films